Carlos Eduardo de Souza Floresta (born August 28, 1982), best known as Kahê, is a Brazilian former footballer who played as a forward. He played for Oeste, Nacional, Palmeiras, Gençlerbirliği, Manisaspor, Karşıyaka, Denizlispor, Ponte Preta and Borussia Mönchengladbach.

References

External links
 
 

Living people
1982 births
Association football forwards
Brazilian footballers
Naturalized citizens of Turkey
Nacional Atlético Clube (SP) players
Associação Portuguesa de Desportos players
Associação Atlética Ponte Preta players
Sociedade Esportiva Palmeiras players
Borussia Mönchengladbach players
Gençlerbirliği S.K. footballers
Manisaspor footballers
Denizlispor footballers
Karşıyaka S.K. footballers
Oeste Futebol Clube players
Kedah Darul Aman F.C. players
Bundesliga players
Süper Lig players
TFF First League players
Brazilian expatriate footballers
Brazilian expatriate sportspeople in Germany
Expatriate footballers in Germany
Brazilian expatriate sportspeople in Turkey
Expatriate footballers in Turkey
Footballers from São Paulo